The Piano Guys 2 is the third studio album by American musical group The Piano Guys. It was released on May 7, 2013, by Portrait (a division of Sony Masterworks). The album made its chart début at number 38 on the US Billboard 200.

The deluxe version of The Piano Guys 2 comes with a DVD featuring 11 music videos.

Track listing

Personnel
Per liner notes
The Piano Guys
Steven Sharp Nelson - Cellist/Songwriter
Jon Schmidt - Pianist/Songwriter
Al van der Beek - Music Producer/Songwriter
Paul Anderson - Video Producer/Videographer

Additional musicians
Lindsey Stirling - violin on "Mission Impossible"

Charts

Weekly charts

Year-end charts

References 

2013 classical albums
Sony Music albums
The Piano Guys albums